John Patrick George Freeman  (born 25 March 1951) is a retired British diplomat who until July 2019 was Governor of the Turks and Caicos Islands.

Career
Freeman was educated at King's College London where he gained a PhD in 1986 with the thesis titled "Britain's nuclear arms control policy in the context of Anglo-American relations 1957–68", which later became a book published by Macmillan. He subsequently joined the Foreign and Commonwealth Office (FCO) in 1986, serving at first as Head of the South Africa Section, 1986–1989. He has been Permanent Representative to the United Nations in Vienna 1997–2001 and Permanent Representative to the Conference on Disarmament 2004–2006, and was seconded as Deputy Director-General of the Organisation for the Prohibition of Chemical Weapons 2006–2011. He was Ambassador to the Argentine Republic 2012–2016. He has been a visiting professor at King's College London.

Freeman was appointed Companion of the Order of St Michael and St George (CMG) in the 2016 New Year Honours.

References

1951 births
Living people
Alumni of King's College London
Ambassadors of the United Kingdom to Argentina
Governors of the Turks and Caicos Islands
Academics of King's College London
Companions of the Order of St Michael and St George